Hopewell School, also known as the Hopewell-Rosenwald School, is a former African American school in Cedar Creek, Texas, that was listed on the National Register of Historic Places on July 15, 2015. The school was built in 1921–1922 with assistance from the Rosenwald Fund. The school opened in 1922 and closed in the late 1950s.

The school was initially funded by a monetary and a land grant from Martin and Sophia MacDonald of Bastrop County and the Rosenwald Fund. It was built by local residents to educate young African American children during the early to mid 1900s, a time of racial segregation in the United States.

Restoration
After the school closed, the building fell into disrepair. In 2015, Bluebonnet Electric Cooperative awarded a $50,000 capital grant to the Hopewell-Rosenwald Community School Project to help convert the building into a community center. Workers from American YouthWorks will help with the repairs.

See also

National Register of Historic Places listings in Bastrop County, Texas

References

External links

http://rosenwaldfilm.org/rosenwald/restoration/
National Trust for Historic Preservation

Rosenwald schools
School buildings on the National Register of Historic Places in Texas
School buildings completed in 1922
Buildings and structures in Bastrop County, Texas
National Register of Historic Places in Bastrop County, Texas
1922 establishments in Texas